What Will the Neighbours Say? is the second studio album by English-Irish all-female pop group Girls Aloud. It was released in the United Kingdom on 29 November 2004 by Polydor Records. Brian Higgins and his production team Xenomania were enlisted to produce the entire album, allowing for more inventive ideas. What Will the Neighbours Say? explores various subgenres of pop music.

What Will the Neighbours Say? was released to mostly positive reviews from contemporary music critics. It yielded five top-ten singles and had high sales, going double platinum in the United Kingdom and Ireland. The album was followed by Girls Aloud's first tour, the What Will the Neighbours Say...? Tour.

Conception
Band member Cheryl revealed in an interview that although Girls Aloud's debut album Sound of the Underground and its singles had been successful, in 2004, Polydor Records were considering dropping them from the label after what they perceived as underperformance of the album's sales, considering that the group was formed during Popstars: The Rivals, which drew 20 million viewers, which according to record executives was not  "turning into 20 million sales." However, Polydor's then-marketing director, Peter Lorraine, appealed to the label and convinced them to allow the group to record a second album.

Polydor enlisted Brian Higgins and Xenomania to produce Girls Aloud's second album in its entirety, following their production of six tracks from Sound of the Underground, including the album's three singles, and three more tracks: "Girls on Film", "You Freak Me Out" (for the film Freaky Friday) and "Jump" (for the film Love Actually), which all featured on the album's late 2003 reissue. "When the second album came round, the label said, 'Listen, we're not going to do this group any more if you don't do it.'" Higgins explained. "I think my initial reaction was to do a few tracks and he said, 'No, you have to do this because I think you're the only person who understands exactly what it is'. So, that's how we took it on."

Higgins said, "The pressure to come up with singles was, as always, immense. But [...] we were able to have a lot of fun working on ideas that were maybe a little too odd to be on the radio." The album was recorded from April to September 2004, although its lead single "The Show" was released in June 2004. The album title comes from a lyric in the song "Love Machine" which asks, "what will the neighbours say this time?" This lyric is a reference itself to a line from "Sound of the Underground", in which Girls Aloud sing "Neighbour's banging on the bathroom wall / He's saying 'Crank the bass, I gotta get some more'"

Music

Style and lyrics
What Will the Neighbours Say? explores different subgenres of pop, especially incorporating electronic dance music into electropop. Synthesizers are more prominent on the album. The usage of guitar was also prominent in several songs. The backing track to "Love Machine", composed by Xenomania musicians Tim Powell and Nick Coler, was inspired by The Smiths, while "Wake Me Up" includes a guitar riff inspired by garage rock. What Will the Neighbours Say? also includes a number of ballads.

The lyrics focus on a number of more adult topics, often dealing with sexuality, as well as themes of teenage rebellion and heartbreak. The lyrics to "The Show" contain an anti-promiscuity message. "Wake Me Up" faced a slight controversy due to its "boozy lyrics." The song references Bud and margaritas in the first verse. Unlike Sound of the Underground, Girls Aloud became involved in the writing process. "We don't let them out of the room till they've given every ounce of melodic instinct that they've got in them, [...] at the end, you find they've contributed really well," Higgins stated in an interview with The Observer. Nadine Coyle admitted, "I needed to be pushed into songwriting, because I wasn't really interested". The album's lyrics were praised by critics, noting "the girls are usually singing something interesting. Someone at Xenomania has a knack for writing witty couplets".

Songs
The album begins with its lead single, "The Show", described as "a feisty, thumping track with a positively rude bassline" and a "rush of thrilling synth stabs and natty vocal hooks". It was also compared to "an early-1990s rave record." "Love Machine", the second single, follows.  The Guardian called the song a "perfect example of Xenomania's uniquely rousing approach to pop." It was called "three and a half minutes of pure joy, taking in a guitar line that sounds like it's been nicked from an old rockabilly tune, some mid-'80s synth pop and a rousing chorus." A cover of The Pretenders' "I'll Stand by You" was recorded especially for Children in Need. The first version of "I'll Stand by You" that Xenomania created was described as a "weird, modernist breakbeat version", which was scrapped upon deciding an updated version of the original song would be better suited for Children in Need. Critics felt it was "arguable whether this cover adds much to the Pretenders' original." Girls Aloud's version has also been compared to Shakespears Sister. "Jump", a cover of a song by The Pointer Sisters, was originally taken from the re-release of Sound of the Underground and the soundtrack to Love Actually. Cheryl Cole noted in Girls Aloud's 2008 autobiography Dreams That Glitter – Our Story that the single "was the point when we realized everything we'd been doing was quite down and moody [...] and that's not what people wanted." The album's fifth track is its final single "Wake Me Up". The Guardians review said that the song sounds like what would happen if "you married an alarmingly fast techno thud to an implausibly dumb three-chord garage-rock riff."

"Deadlines and Diets", originally released in 2000 by Moonbaby (a pseudonym of Xenomania songwriter Miranda Cooper), is a song about one night stands. The song received comparisons to All Saints, specifically their breakthrough single "Never Ever". "Big Brother", co-written by Cheryl Cole, was labelled "crunchy electro." It was noted that the song "could be about anything, up to and including the admittedly unlikely topic of sexual subservience to a totalitarian dictator." The "voyeur-themed" song was compared to ABBA, New Order and the Thompson Twins by one reviewer. "Hear Me Out" was co-written by Sarah Harding. The ballad received comparisons to those of the Spice Girls. One of the album's most noteworthy songs, "Graffiti My Soul", was intended for Britney Spears's In The Zone. It was turned down for its lack of a chorus; Higgins said that they wanted "essentially "Sound of the Underground 2". The track was described as "a full-scale collision between Madonna, Michael Jackson and the Prodigy" and "frighteningly sharp and sassy." The Guardian said the song makes you question: "What if the Prodigy hadn't turned down the chance to write with Madonna?" "Real Life", the album's tenth track, "unexpectedly evokes Martina Topley-Bird's Tricky tracks."

"Here We Go" was also originally recorded by Moonbaby. Aqua singer Lene Nystrøm Rasted, who co-wrote Girls Aloud's "No Good Advice", also recorded a version of the song for her 2003 album Play With Me. "Here We Go" is also the basis for the theme song to the television cartoon series, Totally Spies!. The track has been described as "a relatively filthy '60s romp". "Thank Me Daddy", co-written by Kimberley Walsh, is a "saucy disco romp". "I Say a Prayer for You", a bonus track co-written and entirely sung by Nicola Roberts, also received comparisons to Spice Girls' ballads. The album's final track is "100 Different Ways", which Nadine Coyle co-wrote and sings solo.

Release
What Will the Neighbours Say? was released in the United Kingdom on 29 November 2004. The international versions of the album exclude the bonus tracks "I Say a Prayer for You" and "100 Different Ways". What Will the Neighbours Say? and other Girls Aloud releases appeared on the US iTunes Store on 26 June 2007.

Singles
The album's first single was technically their cover of "Jump", although the song initially appeared on the re-release of Sound of the Underground and was the recorded for the Love Actually soundtrack. The music video for "Jump" was made to appear like it was intertwined with Love Actually. The song debuted at number two on the UK Singles Chart. "The Show" was the first single exclusive to What Will the Neighbours Say?. The song was critically acclaimed and peaked at number two. The Times noted that "Brian Higgins's Xenomania hit factory proved itself as good as the greatest song teams in pop history with this thrillingly off-the-wall chart-topper. The music video for "The Show" takes place in a salon called "Curls Allowed." "The Show" was released in Australia in June 2006, as the second single from the Australian version of Chemistry. "Love Machine" was the second single from What Will the Neighbours Say?. Critics said the song was "so unlike anything else in the charts right now...proving once again that they're still one of the most exciting bands in pop right now." The music video takes place at the fictitious nightclub, the Eskimo Club. It was number two on the UK Singles Chart for two consecutive weeks. The song appeared in television advertisements for Homebase from 2006 to 2009. "I'll Stand by You" served as the album's third single, released for Children in Need. The track was announced as a single just ten days before its 15 November 2004 release. It became Girls Aloud's second number one on the UK Singles Chart. The album's final single was "Wake Me Up". In 2005, "Wake Me Up" won the award for the Popjustice £20 Music Prize, an annual prize awarded to the best British pop single of the year. Girls Aloud had previously won the award in 2003 for "No Good Advice". The music video for "Wake Me Up" was directed by Harvey & Carolyn and starred Girls Aloud as "biker chicks". It became their first single to miss the top three when it peaked at number four. "Graffiti My Soul" was going to be the sixth single released from the album, but was cancelled because the group wanted to start work on their third album.

Reception

Critical response

What Will the Neighbours Say? received positive reviews from music critics. Stylus Magazine declared, "There is no pop in the world like Girls Aloud today." The Guardian hailed it as "a great album: funny, clever, immediate, richly inventive." Girls Aloud were praised for simply making it past their debut. What Will the Neighbours Say? was referred to as "nothing less than the pop album of the year." RTÉ.ie called it a "near perfect pop album", praised its "vivacious and engulfing tunes" and stated that there is "pretty much nothing to dislike" about it. A review by Entertainment.ie's Andrew Lynch said, "Girls Aloud really shouldn't have made it as far as a second album. [...] There's just one problem – the girls have a knack of coming up with utterly infectious pop songs".

What Will the Neighbours Say? did receive mild criticism for being "top-heavy", with the singles comprising the first five songs which AllMusic said "left the second half of the album rather thin on killer tracks." BBC Music agreed, stating that the album "settles into a fairly predictable mix of well-produced tunes covering the various pop styles and themes." The reviewer, however, did say "in the ultra-fickle world of TV-generated pop, Girls Aloud have real staying power." Yahoo! Music announced more cynically, despite giving the album 7/10, that "this album isn't an investment piece so much a cheap thrill to be savoured and worn out by next Christmas." Girls Aloud's covers of "I'll Stand by You" (originally by The Pretenders) and "Jump" (originally by The Pointer Sisters) were also criticised. MusicOMH said, "it's when the girls stray from their regular songwriting team that they become unstuck. [...] The two covers are the only mis-step though here."

Commercial performance
What Will the Neighbours Say? became the group's second top ten album in the UK Albums Chart, where it was certified platinum with sales of over 300,000. It debuted at number six on the UK albums chart, spending two further weeks in the top ten and spent a total of 17 non-consecutive weeks on the chart. In Ireland it debuted at number twelve, remaining in the top twenty for eight weeks. The album was released in select European territories in late 2004; however, it failed to generate much interest due to lack of promotion, with the exception of Greece, where it reached the top ten.

Track listing
All tracks were produced by Brian Higgins and Xenomania. Credits adapted from the liner notes of What Will the Neighbours Say?.

"I'll Stand by You" is a cover of the Anglo-American rock band, The Pretenders.
"Jump" is a cover of the American R&B group the Pointer Sisters. The song also appeared on the re-issue of Sound of the Underground.
The tracks "Deadlines & Diets" and "Here We Go" are covers of the Xenomania songwriter, Miranda "Moonbaby" Cooper. The original version of the latter was also covered by Lene Nystrøm in 2003. The Moonbaby version was used as the theme song for the animated series Totally Spies!.
"Graffiti My Soul" contains a sample of the Peplab song "It's Not the Drug" and was originally offered to Britney Spears.
"Real Life" also appears as a b-side to "I'll Stand by You".
"I Say a Prayer for You" is co-written and sung solely by Nicola Roberts.
"100 Different Ways" is co-written and sung solely by Nadine Coyle.

Charts

Weekly charts

Year-end charts

Certifications

ReferencesSources'

2004 albums
Albums produced by Xenomania
Girls Aloud albums